"Sidewise in Time" is a science fiction short story by American writer Murray Leinster that was first published in the June 1934 issue of Astounding Stories.  "Sidewise in Time" served as the title story for Leinster's second story collection in 1950.

The Sidewise Award for Alternate History, established in 1995 to recognize the best alternate history stories and novels of the year, was named in honor of "Sidewise in Time".

Plot summary
Professor Minott is a mathematician at Robinson College in Fredericksburg, Virginia who has determined that an apocalyptic cataclysm is fast approaching that could destroy the entire universe. The cataclysm manifests itself on June 5, 1935 (one year in the future of the story's original publication) when sections of the Earth's surface begin changing places with their counterparts in alternate timelines. A Roman legion from a timeline where the Roman Empire never fell appears on the outskirts of St. Louis, Missouri. Viking longships from a timeline where the Vikings settled North America raid a seaport in Massachusetts. A traveling salesman from Louisville, Kentucky, whose van bears a commercial logo including Uncle Sam with the Stars and Stripes, finds himself in trouble with the law when he travels into an area where the South won the American Civil War. A ferry approaching San Francisco finds the flag of Tsarist Russia flying from a grim  fortress dominating the city.    

When a forest of sequoias appears north of Fredericksburg, Professor Minott leads an expedition of seven students from Robinson College to explore it. They reach the Potomac River, and find on its banks a Chinese village surrounded by rice paddies. At this point, Minott reveals the true situation to the students: he knew in advance that the timeline exchanges were going to take place, and he intends to lead the students to a timeline where he can use his scientific knowledge to gain wealth and power. The party returns to Fredericksburg, which in their absence has been replaced by wilderness, and Minott informs the students that they cannot return to their original timeline.

That night, an airplane from their own timeline makes a crash landing near Minott's party. Before the pilot dies, they learn from him that Washington, D.C. from their timeline was still in place. A student named Blake wants to make for Washington, but Minott refuses. The forest catches fire from the burning airplane, and the party flees to a Roman villa. They are captured by the villa's owner, except for Blake, who escapes. Later that night Blake secretly returns to the villa and frees the others from the slave pen, shooting the owner in the process. The next morning, the party finds itself near a section of their own timeline. Blake leads the other students there, but Minott refuses to come; he still intends to travel to a more primitive timeline and make himself its ruler. One of the women in the party joins him, while the rest of the students return to their timeline.

The students are able to contact the rest of the world and inform them of Minott's deductions about the event. Within two weeks, the timeline exchanges trail off, leaving bits and pieces of other timelines embedded in our own.

Influence
"Sidewise in Time" was among the first science fiction stories about parallel universes. In 1903 H. G. Wells wrote "A Modern Utopia" in which people from our timeline were shown traveling to another, but Wells used this mainly as a literary device to present his speculations of a perfect society. Leinster's story, conversely, introduced the concept to the pulp science fiction readership, bringing about the creation of one of the field's subgenres.  L. Sprague de Camp's 1940 story  "The Wheels of If" followed a single man as he was involuntarily transported through a series of alternate timelines.  H. Beam Piper's paratime series (1948–1965) postulated the existence of a civilization that could travel at will across the timelines, a theme echoed in Larry Niven's "All the Myriad Ways" (1968), Frederik Pohl's The Coming of the Quantum Cats (1986), and Harry Turtledove's Crosstime Traffic series (2003–2008).  Other  stories dealing with travel to parallel timelines include Isaac Asimov's "Living Space" (1956), Keith Laumer's Imperium series (1962–1990), Jack Vance's "Rumfuddle" (1973), and Jack L. Chalker's G.O.D. Inc trilogy (1987–1989).  Lawrence Watt-Evans' story "Storm Trooper" (1992) is set in world whose inhabitants, like those of "Sidewise in Time", must cope with the sudden appearance of sections of other timelines.  Gordon R. Dickson's Time Storm (1977) depicts an Earth ravaged by a cosmic storm that randomly changes the historical periods of local regions, much like "Sidewise in Time".  The anime series Orguss took "Sidewise in Time" as one of its inspirations, and showed the world caught in a trap of constantly changing territories of alternate-Earths.

The setting of Fred Hoyle's October the First Is Too Late (1966) is similar to that of Leinster's story, except that the segments of Earth which are brought together and interact with each other are from different historical periods, rather than from different parallel histories. 

In his comments on the story in Before the Golden Age, Isaac Asimov writes that "Sidewise in Time" had a long-term effect on his thinking.  "It always made me conscious of the 'ifs' in history, and this showed up not only in my science fiction, as in 'The Red Queen's Race', but in my serious books on history as well.  I also used the alternate-history theme, in enormous complexity, in my novel The End of Eternity."

Themes touched upon by Leinster would be taken up at greater length by others: Confederate victory in the American Civil War, a Roman Empire which never fell, enduring Viking colonization of America, Russia keeping its 19th-century colonies in Pacific America, Chinese colonists finding their way to America.

The idea of a scholar using a cataclysmic event to make himself the ruler of primitive people was taken up by S. M. Stirling in the Nantucket and Emberverse series, where the main villains do this repeatedly.

Publication history
Astounding Stories, June 1934
Sidewise in Time, edited by Murray Leinster, Shasta, 1950 
Worlds of Maybe, edited by Robert Silverberg, Dell, 1970 
Before the Golden Age, edited by Isaac Asimov, Doubleday, 1974 
The Best of Murray Leinster, edited by J.J. Pierce, Del Rey, 1978
The Time Travellers—A Science Fiction Quartet, edited by Robert Silverberg & Martin H. Greenberg, Donald I. Fine, 1985 
Great Tales of Classic Science Fiction, edited by Isaac Asimov, Martin H. Greenberg & Charles Waugh, Galahad, 1988 
First Contacts, edited by Joe Rico, NESFA Press, 1998

References

External links 
 

1934 short stories
Alternate history novels set in ancient Rome
Alternate history short stories
American Civil War alternate histories
American short stories
Works by Murray Leinster
Works originally published in Analog Science Fiction and Fact